Over the centuries Suwałki has produced a number of persons who have provided unique contributions to the fields of science, language, politics, religion, sports, visual arts and performing arts.  A list of recent notable persons includes, but is not limited to:

 Jacob ben Moses Bachrach (1824-1896) - noted apologist of Rabbinic Judaism
 Marian Borzęcki (1889-1942) - lawyer, politician, lawyer, Chief of the State Police (Policja Państwowa)
 Jerzy Dąbrowski - Polish Army lieutenant colonel of cavalry, "Zagonczyk".
 Władysław Dąbrowski - a major in the cavalry of the Polish Army, "Zagonczyk" partisan commander in Vilnius in 1919-1920
 Zalman Gradowski (1910–1944), secret diarist at Auschwitz-Birkenau
 Josef Hassid (1923–1950), violinist
 Edmund Kessler - Colonel in the General Staff of the Army of the Russian Empire and the Polish Army 
 Adam Koc (1891–1969), soldier, politician and journalist 
 Maria Konopnicka (1842–1910), a poet, a novelist, a writer for children and youth, a translator, journalist and critic
 Mieczysław Mackiewicz (1880–1954), general
 Henryk Minkiewicz (1880–1940), General of the Polish Army, killed in the Katyn Massacre
a Polish socialist politician and a General of the Polish Army. Member of the Medical Faculty of the Jagiellonian University and, simultaneously, Faculty of painting at the Academy of Fine Arts. Former commander of the Border Defence Corps, he was among the Polish officers murdered in the Katyń massacre.
 Leszek Aleksander Moczulski (1938-) – Poet
 Marion Mushkat (1909–1995), lawyer, colonel, judge, professor/specialist of international public law, military law and international affairs
 Aleksandra Piłsudska (1882–1963), wife of Józef Piłsudski and the Polish first lady
 Zygmunt Podhorski (1891–1960), general, cavalry commander
 Aleksander Putra (1888-1962) – social and political activist, member of Parliament Legislators in the Second Polish Republic, related to Krzysztof Putra
 Zvi Yosef Resnick (1841–1912), Rosh yeshiva (Dean of a rabbinical academy)
 Samuel Rosenthal (1837 - 1902), Jewish chess master and journalist
 Pinchas Sapir (1906–1975), Israeli politician, Minister of Finance
 Avraham Stern (1907-1942) – a Jewish paramilitary leader who founded and led Lehi (the "Stern Gang")
 Edward Szczepanik (1915–2005), economist and the last Polish Prime Minister in Exile
As an Officer (and eventually Major) in the Polish Army, he served with distinction in the Fifth Polish Artillery Regiment - notably in the battles of Monte Cassino, Ancona, and Bologna. In 1945 he received the Cross of the Valorous, and the following year was awarded the Silver Cross of Merit with Swords. He received a PhD in Economics in 1956 from the LSE. On April 7, 1986 he was chosen the successor of Kazimierz Sabbat to be the next Prime Minister of the Second Polish Republic in-exile.   He was awarded the title of Doctor of Economic Science – Honoris Causa in 1995 by the Warsaw School of Economics.
 Andrzej Wajda (1926-), film director
Recipient of an honorary Oscar, he is possibly the most prominent member of the unofficial "Polish Film School" (active circa 1955 to 1963). He is known especially for a trilogy of war films: A Generation (1954), Kanał (1956) and Ashes and Diamonds (1958). Four of his movies have been nominated for the Academy Award for Best Foreign Language Film: The Promised Land (1975), The Maids of Wilko (1979), Man of Iron (1981), and Katyń (2007).
 Alfred Wierusz-Kowalski (1849-1915) – painter of the Munich school, one of the most popular among Jozef Brandt and Władysław Czachórski
 Marcin Wojciechowski - Presenter and Journalist on Radio ZET

References

People from Suwałki
Suwałki